Jaraguá do Sul is a city in the north of the Brazilian state of Santa Catarina.

History
The city was founded on July 25, 1876, by engineer and Brazilian Army colonel Emílio Carlos Jourdan and his family. The city was originally named just Jaraguá, but it was later renamed to Jaraguá do Sul due to a city already named Jaraguá in Goiás state.

Etymology
Jaraguá means Lord of the Valley in a Tupi–Guarani language. It was the name given by the indigenous population of the city to the Boa Vista Hill (Morro da Boa Vista).

Geography
It borders Campo Alegre and São Bento do Sul to the north; Blumenau, Massaranduba, Pomerode and Rio dos Cedros to the south; Guaramirim, Joinville and Schroeder to the east and Corupá to the west.

The Itapocu River is Jaraguá do Sul's important river, crossing the city, being Jaraguá River and Itapocuzinho River its main affluents.

The climate is considered temperate, with average annual temperature around 21 °C. In summer temperatures often exceed 35 °C, although they may reach 40 °C in a few days. The winter is relatively cold for Brazilian standards, with an average minimum temperature around 12 °C in the months of June and July. Frosts occur almost every winter. Zero temperatures are rare, and that mark was reached most recently on July 14, 2000. The lowest temperature occurred on July 19, 1975, when thermometers recorded −2 °C. The highest temperature ever recorded was 42.5 °C on January 3, 1973.

Sports
Malwee/Jaraguá, formerly known as Associação Desportiva Jaraguá, is a successful futsal club, which have won the national league twice. In 2007, the city's arena, named Arena Jaraguá, hosted the final matches of the Grand Prix de Futsal. The arena also hosted two Ultimate Fighting Championship events, UFC on FX 8 in 2013 and UFC Fight Night 36 in 2014.

The city's football (soccer) club is Grêmio Esportivo Juventus. The retired goalkeeper Eduardo Roberto Stinghen, nicknamed Ado, was born in the city in 1946. Also, Filipe Luís, currently playing for Flamengo, was born in the city.

Industry
The local economy is mainly based in metallurgy and clothing industries. The city was the origin for several worldwide companies, like WEG (electric motors and industrial electronics), Marisol (clothing), Duas Rodas (food seasoning), Malwee (clothing), Menegotti (construction equipment) and many others. The city is the 3rd largest economy of the state.

FEMUSC
Jaragua do Sul is home to the Festival de Musica de Santa Catarina which was created by Alex Klein.  The festival is held in late January and attracts students and faculty from all over the world. The program involves faculty and students recitals, orchestral and band performances, lessons and masterclasses.

Schützenfest
The Schützenfest (also known in Brazil as Festa dos Atiradores) is a traditional festival held annually since 1988, celebrated in October in Jaraguá do Sul. It is part of the popular festivals celebrated in that month in Santa Catarina state due to the German colonization in the region.

Demographics

Ethnic groups
The first inhabitants of the city were the indigenous people of the Xokleng and the Kaingang. Later the following ethnic groups immigrated to the city: Germans, Hungarians, Italians, Poles, and Africans, who were brought to the city as slaves.
By 2002 City Hall research concluded that 45% of the people from Jaraguá do Sul are descended from Germans. The other main groups were Italians (25%), Poles (6%), and Hungarians (3%); 21% had other ancestry.[33]

Notable people
Filipe Luís Football player
Taila Santos mixed martial artist 
Venerable Aloísio Sebastião Boeing

Population growth

Bairros 
Bairros in Jaraguá do Sul.:

References

External links
 Jaraguá do Sul City Hall

 
Populated places established in 1876
1876 establishments in Brazil
Municipalities in Santa Catarina (state)